Yigal Ozeri (born 1958) is an Israeli artist based in New York City. He is known for large-scale cinematic portraits of young women in landscapes. His works are photo-realistic oil paintings. His son is Adam Ozeri, a professional soccer player.

Biography 
Yigal Ozeri was born in Israel in 1958. He currently lives and works in New York City.

In 1997, Ozeri collaborated with Israeli poet Ronny Someck to produce The Razor that Cut the Metaphoric Face of Poetry which included five etchings by Ozeri, and five ensuring poems by Someck. Ozeri's etchings, in order, were titled Pointed Tower, Tears of Buildings, Unbuilt Pagoda, Dirty Laundry, and Tears of Buildings II. The book itself was produced by The Cabri Print Workshop, based out of Kibbutz Cabri in the Western Galilee.

In 2014 he co-founded Mana Contemporary where he has a studio in the flagship of Jersey City.

Solo exhibitions

2010

Lizzie Smoking, Galería Senda, Barcelona, Spain
Lizzie in the Snow, Mark Moore Gallery, Santa Monica, CA
Desire for Anima, Contemporary by Angela Li, Hong Kong, China
Olga in the Park, Galerie Brandt, Amsterdam, Netherlands

2011

Territory, Martin Asbaek Gallery, Copenhagen, Denmark
Territory, Zemack Contemporary Art Gallery, Tel Aviv, Israel
Garden of the Gods, Mike Weiss Gallery, New York, NY
Luce silenziosa (Silent light), Bologna, Italy

2012 

Territory, Mike Weiss Gallery, New York, NY
Photorealism, Galerie de Bellefeuille, Montreal, Canada
The Boathouse, Galerie Andreas Binder, Munich, Germany
Territory, Karen Jenkins Johnson, San Francisco, CA
Territory, Scott White Contemporary Art, La Jolla, CA

2013 

Territory, Angell Gallery, Toronto, Canada
Triads, Galerie Brandt, Amsterdam, Netherlands

2014 

Fiction of Distance, Galería Álvaro Alcázar, Madrid, Spain
Photorealism in the Digital Age, Mana Contemporary, Chicago, Illinois

2017 
"The Storm". Zemack Gallery for Contemporary Art. Tel Aviv.

2018 
"Yigal Ozeri: A New York Story". Louis K. Meisel Gallery. New York City.

Collections 
Yigal Ozeri's art are in permanent collections of the Whitney Museum of American Art, the McNay Art Museum in San Antonio, the Jewish Museum of New York, The Israel Museum, Tel Aviv Museum of Art, Albertina and other public institutions.

References

External links 
Yigal Ozeri
Yigal Ozeri in Duncan Gallery
Yigal Ozeri on Artsy

Jewish painters
Israeli Jews
1959 births
Living people
Israeli painters
Israeli portrait painters
20th-century American Jews
20th-century American painters
21st-century American Jews
21st-century American painters